Otacílio Mariano Neto (born 17 November 1982), known as Otacílio Neto or just Otacílio, is a Brazilian football attacker, who plays for Iguatu.

Biography
Born in Orós, Ceará, Otacílio Neto started his career at Ituano of São Paulo state. He then left for Osasco FC and in July 2004 signed by Noroeste.

Noroeste
He then loaned to Portuguesa, Oeste and Barretos. On 1 July 2005 he returned to Noroeste. In December 2005, he signed a contract extension, which last until December 2006. He played twice in national cup that season. In June 2006 he extended his contract again, which last until December 2007. He finished as the last 16 (third stage) in 2006 Campeonato Brasileiro Série C with Noroeste He played 14 out of possible 18 matches, scored once. In 2007 season he played 3 times in the national cup, and scored 7 goals in 17 appearances at 2007 Campeonato Paulista. He finished as the runner-up at 2007 Campeonato Paulista do Interior. After renewed his contract with club in June 2007, he was loaned to Figueirense. He made his Campeonato Brasileiro Série A debut with the Santa Catarina side, played 25 league matches. He also played twice in 2007 Copa Sudamericana first round.

In February 2008 he renewed his contract again which last until December 2009. He was the team top-scorer at 2008 Campeonato Paulista, scored 10 goals in the first 12 games of the state league, including a hat-trick against Ituano on 27 January 2008. However, he did not play the rest of the matches, as he was injured during training. The team finished as the runner-up again in 2008 Campeonato Paulista do Interior.

Corinthians
In August 2008 he was signed by Corinthians Paulista for R$ 675,000 on a 4-year contract., which the club acquired 40% economic rights and the rest was owned by an investor "Luis Fernando Assessoria Esportiva". Corinthians later bought more economic rights and cost an additional R$575,000.

He won 2008 Campeonato Brasileiro Série B with team. He made his league debut on 16 September 2008 and played 6 times in Série B.

After played for the team at 2009 Campeonato Paulista (3 goals in 13 games), 2009 Brazilian Cup (5 games) and 3 games in 2009 Série A, he was loaned to league rival Grêmio Barueri in July.

In January 2010, he was loaned to Ponte Preta, He scored 2 goals for the team at 2010 Campeonato Paulista. He played 13 times (all start) in the state league and infamously cautioned 10 times and sent off once (after cautioned second time on 20 February, round 10). The team finished as the semi-finalists in 2010 Campeonato Paulista do Interior. He played his only match at 2010 Campeonato Brasileiro Série B on 15 May.

In June left for Goiás, rejoining Wellington Saci. Noroeste also wanted to re-sign Otacílio in October 2010. He played for Goiás at 2010 Copa Sudamericana semi-finals (both legs) and finals (both legs), scored once in the final first leg. The team losing to Independiente after penalty shootout, which Otacílio Neto already substituted by Éverton Santos due to injury.

On 3 January 2011 he was confirmed as a player of Noroeste. On 30 June 2011 he joined Bragantino in a 5-month loan.

Honours
Ituano
 Campeonato Brasileiro Série C: 2003

Noroeste
 Copa Paulista: 2005
 Campeonato Paulista do Interior: 2007, 2008

Corinthians
 Campeonato Brasileiro Série B: 2008
 Copa do Brasil: 2009
 Campeonato Paulista: 2009

Sete de Dourados
 Campeonato Sul-Mato-Grossense: 2016

References

External links
 
 Futpedia 

Sportspeople from Ceará
1982 births
Living people
Brazilian footballers
Association football forwards
Campeonato Brasileiro Série A players
Campeonato Brasileiro Série B players
Campeonato Brasileiro Série C players
Campeonato Brasileiro Série D players
Ituano FC players
Osasco Futebol Clube players
Esporte Clube Noroeste players
Associação Portuguesa de Desportos players
Oeste Futebol Clube players
Barretos Esporte Clube players
Figueirense FC players
Sport Club Corinthians Paulista players
Associação Atlética Ponte Preta players
Goiás Esporte Clube players
Clube Atlético Bragantino players
Botafogo Futebol Clube (SP) players
Rio Branco Esporte Clube players
Colo Colo de Futebol e Regatas players
Ypiranga Futebol Clube players
Guarani Esporte Clube (CE) players
Clube Desportivo Sete de Setembro players
Floresta Esporte Clube players